The following lists events that happened during 1952 in the Union of Soviet Socialist Republics.

Incumbents
 General Secretary of the Communist Party of the Soviet Union – Joseph Stalin (until 16 October)
 Chairman of the Presidium of the Supreme Soviet of the Soviet Union – Nikolay Shvernik
 Chairman of the Council of Ministers of the Soviet Union – Joseph Stalin

Events
 Mingrelian Affair
 Doctors' plot: A group of prominent Moscow doctors, mostly Jewish, is falsely accused of conspiring to assassinate Soviet leaders.

June
 13 June – Catalina affair: Two Swedish aircraft are shot down by Soviet fighter jets over the Baltic.

August
 12 August – Night of the Murdered Poets: Thirteen Soviet Jews are executed on false charges.

October
 5–14 October – The 19th Congress of the Communist Party of the Soviet Union is held.

November
 5 November – The 1952 Severo-Kurilsk tsunami kills 2,336 people in the town of Severo-Kurilsk.

December
 15 December – The Shch class submarine S-117 is lost due to unknown causes.

Births
 1 January – Jury Zacharanka, Belarusian politician 
 15 February – Nikolai Sorokin, actor
 23 March – Antonina Dvoryanets, hydraulic engineer and political activist
 3 May – Leonid Khachiyan, mathematician
 14 June – Robert Lepikson, Estonian racing driver and politician, Estonian Minister of the Interior (d. 2006)
 20 August – Sergey Chemezov, CEO of Rostec
 12 September – Sergey Karaganov, political scientist
 7 October – Vladimir Putin, President of Russia

Deaths
 9 March – Alexandra Kollontai, Bolshevik
 15 March – Mikhail Doller, film director

See also
 1952 in fine arts of the Soviet Union
 List of Soviet films of 1952

References

 
1950s in the Soviet Union
Years in the Soviet Union
Soviet Union
Soviet Union
Soviet Union